Gabriel Koch is a Norwegian ice hockey defenceman who plays for the Malmö Redhawks of the SHL. He spent his junior years in the Vålerenga organization, where he also made his first team debut.

Career statistics

References

External links

2004 births
Living people
Malmö Redhawks players
Norwegian ice hockey defencemen